Sir John Stonhouse, 3rd Baronet, PC (c.1672–1733) was an English landowner and Tory politician who sat in the English and then British House of Commons from 1701 to 1733.

Life
Stonhouse was the eldest son of Sir John Stonhouse, 2nd Baronet of Radley and his wife Martha Brigges  daughter of Robert Brigges, merchant, of St  Paul’s Churchyard, London, and widow of Richard Spencer, Vintner, of Berry Street, Aldgate, London. He matriculated at The Queen's College, Oxford on 12 April 1690, aged 17 and was admitted at the Inner Temple in 1690. He succeeded his father to the baronetcy in 1700.

He held the seat for the rest of his life, as a Tory.

From 1721, Stonhouse had Radley Hall built. The work was carried out by the Oxford masons Bartholomew Peisley III and William Townesend, to 1725.

Family
Stonhouse married twice. By his first wife Mary Mellish he had two daughters, of whom Martha married Arthur Vansittart of Shottesbrook, and was mother of Robert Vansittart, Henry Vansittart and Arthur Vansittart, MP for Berkshire. His second wife was Penelope, daughter of Sir Robert Dashwood, 1st Baronet. They had nine children. Of those, three sons (John, William and James) in succession held the baronetcy. One of the daughters, Penelope, married John Leveson-Gower, 1st Earl Gower, as her second husband; another, Catherine, married Robert Lee, 4th Earl of Lichfield. Anne married Sir William Bowyer, 3rd Baronet and was mother of Sir George Bowyer, 5th Baronet.

Radley Hall descended to a granddaughter of the 3rd Baronet, Penelope, Lady Rivers. She was the daughter of Penelope, by her first husband, Sir Henry Atkins, 4th Baronet of Clapham; she married George Pitt, 1st Baron Rivers. Sir James Stonhouse died unmarried in 1792, leaving the Hall to Lady Rivers. Under the terms of the will, when she died in 1795, it passed to Sir George Bowyer, 5th Baronet.

Notes

1670s births
1733 deaths
Members of the Parliament of Great Britain for Berkshire
English MPs 1701–1702
English MPs 1702–1705
English MPs 1705–1707
British MPs 1707–1708
British MPs 1708–1710
British MPs 1710–1713
British MPs 1713–1715
British MPs 1715–1722
British MPs 1722–1727
British MPs 1727–1734
Alumni of The Queen's College, Oxford
Members of the Inner Temple
Members of the Privy Council of the United Kingdom